Hsieh Su-wei and Barbora Strýcová defeated Gabriela Dabrowski and Xu Yifan in the final, 6−2, 6−4 to win the ladies' doubles tennis title at the 2019 Wimbledon Championships. With the win, Strýcová attained the WTA no. 1 doubles ranking for the first time – Kristina Mladenovic, Elise Mertens and Ashleigh Barty were also in contention for the top ranking. Hsieh and Strýcová won the title without losing a set during the tournament.

Barbora Krejčíková and Kateřina Siniaková were the defending champions, but lost in the semifinals to Dabrowski and Xu.

This was the first Wimbledon to feature a final set tie break rule. Upon reaching 12–12 in the third set, a standard tie-break would be played where the winners would be the first to reach at least seven points and lead by two points.

Bethanie Mattek-Sands and Samantha Stosur were each bidding to complete the career Grand Slam in doubles, but lost in the second and third round, respectively.

Seeds

Draw

Finals

Top half

Section 1

Section 2

Bottom half

Section 3

Section 4

References

External links
 Ladies' Doubles draw
2019 Wimbledon Championships – Women's draws and results at the International Tennis Federation

Women's Doubles
Wimbledon Championship by year – Women's doubles